Moha is a village and district of the municipality of Wanze, located in the province of Liège in Wallonia, Belgium.

From the end of the 9th century until the early 10th, Moha was the seat of the County of Moha, and the today ruined  was the seat of the counts. Small-scale extraction of lead and silver took place here during the Middle Ages; in the 19th century large-scale stone quarries were established.

Apart from the castle, there are several other historical buildings in the village, including a fortified farm from the 16th century. The current village church was built in 1912 and replaced an older structure.

References

External links

Populated places in Liège Province